MEMCS is the Middle East Media Center for Studies. MEMCS is a newly formed independent organization based in Egypt, which aims at delivering credible news to the international community. The founding partner of MEMCS is Author and journalist Abdel Latif El-menawy.

References

Mass media companies of Egypt